Fanos (before 1926: Σπάντσα - Spantsa) is a village in Florina Regional Unit, Macedonia, Greece.

The Greek census (1920) recorded 142 people in the village and in 1923 there were 250 inhabitants (or 38 families) who were Muslim. Following the Greek-Turkish population exchange, in 1926 within Spantsa there were refugee families from East Thrace (4), Asia Minor (1) and the Caucasus (26). The Greek census (1928) recorded 122 village inhabitants. There were 32 refugee families (101 people) in 1928.

References 

Populated places in Florina (regional unit)

Amyntaio